Chiretolpis xanthomelas is a moth of the family Erebidae. It is found on the Tanimbar Islands.

References

Nudariina
Moths described in 1900
Moths of Indonesia